Seminar II: The Holy Rites of Primitivism Regressionism is the second full-length album by Old Man Gloom, released in 2001. It was released simultaneously with Seminar III.

Critical reception
AllMusic wrote that the album "plays out as a sort of roller coaster ride, with quiet ambient drones giving way to full-on metalcore assaults (and vice versa) throughout its 17 tracks."

Track listing
 "Brain Returns To Initial State" – 0:53
 "Bells Dark Above Our Heads" – 4:11
 "Branch Breaker" – 0:51
 "Radio Crackles Spill Down My Face" – 1:33
 "Hot Salvation" – 3:10
 "Breath Drops Out In Ice And Glass" – 5:57
 "Rape Athena" – 1:46
 "Roar Of The Forest Rose To Thunder" – 2:24
 "Clenched Tight In The Fist Of God" – 2:16
 "Only Dogs Hear (Here)" – 0:51
 "Jaws Of The Lion" – 2:42
 "Smoke Out Loud" – 6:26
 "Deserts In Your Eyes" – 3:09
 "Meditations In B Part V & VI" – 5:48
 "Cinders Of The Simian Psyche" – 2:43
 "Three Ring Ocean Sideshow" – 5:43
 "Mandied (Self: Reborn)" – 8:10

Track 17 is a hidden track

Credits
 Kurt Ballou – Producer
 Steve Brodsky – Lyricist
 Santos "Hanno" Montano –  Drums, Backup vocals, Data backup, Viral marketing, Burritos
 Nate Newton – Guitar, Vocals
 Jay Randall – Electronics
 Luke Scarola
 Caleb Scofield – Bass Guitar, Vocals
 Aaron Turner – Guitar, Vocals

References

Old Man Gloom albums
2001 albums
Albums with cover art by Aaron Turner
Albums produced by Kurt Ballou